Just Friends is a 2005 American Christmas comedy film directed by Roger Kumble, written by Adam 'Tex' Davis and starring Ryan Reynolds, Amy Smart, Anna Faris, Chris Klein and Christopher Marquette. The plot focuses on a formerly obese high school student (Reynolds) who attempts to free himself from the friend zone after reconnecting with his best friend (Smart) whom he is in love with while visiting his hometown for Christmas.

The film revolves around humorous observation of strictly platonic relationships as "just friends" or "just as best friends". It was shot in Regina and Moose Jaw, Saskatchewan. Just Friends was released on November 23, 2005 and grossed over $50 million.

Plot
In 1995, Chris Brander, an obese high school senior, is secretly in love with his classmate and best friend Jamie Palamino. Confessing his feelings by writing in her yearbook, he attends their graduation party. As he returns Jamie's yearbook, it is swapped by her ex-boyfriend, Tim, who reads the declaration aloud to everyone, humiliating Chris. After kissing him on the cheek, Jamie admits she does not reciprocate his affections. He leaves the party in tears, announcing he will never return and vowing to be more successful than everyone else.

Ten years later, a womanizing Chris has lost weight and lives in Los Angeles as a highly successful record producer and vice president of the company. Before Christmas, company CEO KC, asks him to accompany emerging, self-obsessed pop singer Samantha James to Paris so she signs with their label, and Chris reluctantly complies. She wants a relationship with him but he has no interest after their only date previously led to his hospitalization. On the way to Paris, Samantha accidentally sets her private jet on fire, causing an emergency landing in New Jersey, near Chris's hometown.

Chris takes Samantha to his mother's for the night and re-engages with his teenage past, including his unresolved feelings for Jamie. She meets his mother and 18-year-old brother Mike, a huge fan of Samantha who is infatuated with her. At the local bar, Chris encounters some old classmates, including his other best friend Clark and his wife Darla.

He also sees Jamie, working as a bartender to pay for graduate school for teaching. Chris asks Mike to keep Samantha busy during his date with Jamie, but realizing their platonic friendship is important to him hampers his plan for them to have sex. During a friendly ice skating "day date", Chris is taken away in an ambulance after injuring himself during a hockey game with Jamie and a trio of kids (who dislike him). At the scene, Jamie is reunited with Dusty Dinkleman, a paramedic and former high school classmate also in love with her.

The next night, Chris goes to Jamie's Christmas party to express his feelings for her, but Dusty is already there, charming everyone on guitar. Back at Chris's, Samantha ambushes Mike, demanding he reveal Chris's location. He refuses until she gives him a kiss. In a rage, she drives to Jamie's, crashing through her fence and destroying the Christmas decorations. Chris returns home in embarrassment, and Jamie follows. She tells him she is not mad and they end up spending the night catching up and reminiscing. However, due to Chris's continuing lack of assertion, they end up just sleeping and nothing happens.

The next day, Jamie speaks with Darla about the night before, while Chris goes to Clark for advice. Jamie admits that while they are "just friends", she tried to show Chris she is interested in more. Clark tells Chris that "the timing wasn't right" and their history hinders him. Outside the office, Chris and Clark catch Dusty singing to a nurse and then kissing her. Dusty reveals his plans to have sex with Jamie and humiliate her in a way he felt she humiliated him in high school when he was attracted to her.

Chris tries to warn Jamie, but instead attacks Dusty in front of her. She refuses to listen when he tries to explain. Consequently, he gets drunk and goes to Jamie's bar, finding her there with Dusty. When she gently declines Dusty's sexual advances, he storms out. Chris and Jamie get into another fight, where he blames her for keeping him in the "friend zone" and says she will never amount to anything. Jamie punches Chris and he is tossed out.

Upon returning to Los Angeles and rejecting Samantha's continued advances when she sees him again, Chris realizes that Jamie is his one and only true love. He returns to New Jersey, declares his love to her and they kiss, while the three kids (from the hockey game earlier) watch in disgust. One of the boys hands the girl a cookie, which she gives to the other. She calls the boy who gave her a cookie her friend, which he replies with "the bestest" before realizing he has been put in the friend zone.

Cast

 Ryan Reynolds as Chris Brander
 Amy Smart as Jamie Palamino
 Anna Faris as Samantha James
 Chris Klein as Dusty "Dusty Lee" Dinkleman
 Christopher Marquette as Mike Brander
 Julie Hagerty as Carol Brander
 Stephen Root as KC
 Fred Ewanuick as Clark
 Amy Matysio as Darla
 Barry Flatman as Mr. Palamino
 Maria Arcé as Athena
 Ty Olsson as Tim
 Todd Lewis as Kyle
 Ashley Scott as Janice
 Trenna Keating as Nancy
 JJ Elliott as Movie Goer
 Tina Cerato as Movie Goer
 Amanda Park as Dental Assistant

Alanis Morissette, then Reynolds' fiancée, made a cameo appearance as "herself" as a former client of his character. This came about when the casting director said "we need an Alanis Morissette type" and Reynolds said he knew someone who would fit. This scene was deleted, however, and is only available on the DVD.

Production
The film was shot in Los Angeles and parts of Regina and Moose Jaw, Saskatchewan.

Music

A soundtrack was released November 22, 2005 on New Line Records.

Track listing
 Ben Lee – "Catch My Disease"
 Fountains of Wayne – "Hackensack"
 Rogue Wave – "Eyes"
 Anna Faris (as Samantha James) – "Forgiveness"
 Brendan Benson – "Cold Hands (Warm Heart)"
 Robbers on High Street – "Big Winter"
 The Sights – "Waiting on a Friend"
 Reed Foehl – "When It Comes Around"
 The Lemonheads – "Into Your Arms"
 'Just Friends' Holiday Players – "Christmas, Christmas"
 "Dusty 'Lee' Dinkleman" – "Jamie Smiles"
 Anna Faris (as Samantha James) – "Love from Afar"
 Jeff Cardoni – "Just Friends Score Medley"
 All-4-One – "I Swear"
 Carly Simon – "Coming Around Again"

Original songs performed in the film
 "Forgiveness", performed multiple times by Anna Faris.
 "Jamie Smiles", performed multiple times by Chris Klein
 "Love from Afar", performed by Anna Faris and Renee Sandstrom
 "Just a Guy", performed by Anna Faris (only on the Alternate Ending)

Most songs in the film were written by Adam Schiff, except "When Jamie Smiles", which was written by H. Scott Salinas.

The orchestral score was written by Jeff Cardoni, and orchestrated by Stephen Coleman and Tony Blondal.

Reception

Box office
Just Friends grossed $32.6 million domestically, and $18.3 million in other territories, for a box office total of $50.9 million.

In the United States the film grossed $9.2 million in its opening weekend, finishing 6th at the box office.

Critical response
Just Friends received mixed reviews from critics. The site's critical consensus reads, "There are moments of mirth in this overly broad comedy, but mostly, Just Friends is just not that funny." On Metacritic, the film has a score of 47 out of 100 based on 28 critics, indicating "mixed or average reviews". Audiences polled by CinemaScore gave the film an average grade of "B−" on an A+ to F scale.

See also
 List of Christmas films

References

External links

 
 
 

2005 films
2005 romantic comedy films
2000s Christmas films
2000s Christmas comedy films
2000s coming-of-age comedy films
American romantic comedy films
American Christmas comedy films
American coming-of-age comedy films
Films directed by Roger Kumble
Films set in New Jersey
Films shot in Saskatchewan
Films about siblings
Films about families
Films set in the 1990s
Films set in 1995
Films set in the 2000s
Films set in 2005
New Line Cinema films
2000s English-language films
2000s American films